The Somerset Women cricket team is the women's representative cricket team for the English ceremonial county of Somerset. They play their home games at various grounds across Somerset, most often in Taunton, and are captained by Sophie Luff. Somerset consistently competed in either Division 1 or Division 2 of the Women's County Championship, and won Division 2 of the Women's Twenty20 Cup in 2019. In 2021, they won the West Midlands Group of the Twenty20 Cup. They are partnered with the regional team Western Storm.

History

1956–1999: Early History

The first recorded match involving Somerset Women was in 1956, against Surrey Women Second XI, which they lost by 116 runs. After this, Somerset played various one-off games, whilst West of England Women, which included Somerset, played in the Women's Area Championship from 1980 until 1996 and the Women's County Championship from 1997 until 1999.

2000– : Women's County Championship

Somerset replaced West of England Women in the County Championship in 2000, and finished 3rd in Division 2 in their first season. Somerset remained in the second division until 2005, when they were promoted. This then began a period in which Somerset bounced between the two divisions, being promoted in 2008, 2011, 2015 and 2017 and relegated in 2006, 2010, 2012, 2016 and 2018. Somerset also missed out on promotion in play-offs in 2013 and 2014, with the game being abandoned in 2013 and losing to Warwickshire Women in 2014. In 2019, Somerset finished second-bottom of Division 2.

Somerset have fared similarly in the Women's Twenty20 Cup, for example winning promotion to Division 1 in 2014 and 2016 before being relegated in the following seasons. In 2019, Somerset won Division 2 with 6 victories from 8 games. Following the 2019 season, women's cricket in England was restructured and the 2020 season was cancelled due to the COVID-19 pandemic. In 2021, only the Twenty20 Cup took place, with Somerset competing in the West Midlands Group. They won their regional division, winning 5 of their 8 matches. Somerset bowler Lorraine Szczepanski was the second-highest wicket-taker in the tournament, with 13 wickets, and batters Georgia Hennessy and Sophie Luff were the 2nd and 4th leading run-scorers, respectively. They finished second in their group in the 2022 Women's Twenty20 Cup and subsequently progressed to the group final, where they lost to Warwickshire. Somerset have had various notable players appear for them over the years, most prominently the former England Women players Anya Shrubsole and Fran Wilson.

Players

Current squad
Based on appearances in the 2022 season.

Notable players
Players who have played for Somerset and played internationally are listed below, in order of first international appearance (given in brackets):

 Jean Cummins (1954)
 Audrey Disbury (1957)
 Janet Godman (1991)
 Sarah Collyer (1998)
 Katharine Winks (1998)
 Laura Harper (1999)
 Jackie Hawker (1999)
 Hannah Lloyd (1999)
 Kath Wilkins (1999)
 Caroline Atkins (2001)
 Isabelle Westbury (2005)
 Steph Davies (2008)
 Anya Shrubsole (2008)
 Fran Wilson (2010)
 Lizelle Lee (2013)

Seasons

Women's County Championship

Women's Twenty20 Cup

Honours
 County Championship:
 Division Two champions (4) – 2004, 2005, 2013 & 2015
 Women's Twenty20 Cup:
 Division Two champions (2) – 2009, 2016 & 2019
 Group winners (1) – 2021

See also
 Somerset County Cricket Club
 Western Storm

References

Cricket in Somerset
Women's cricket teams in England
Somerset County Cricket Club